Thomas Kavanagh may refer to:

 Thomas Kavanagh (politician) (1767–1837), Irish landowner and politician
 Thomas Christian Kavanagh (1912–1978), American civil engineer and educator
 Thomas G. Kavanagh (1917–1997), American jurist
 Thomas M. Kavanagh (1909–1975), American jurist
 Thomas Henry Kavanagh (1821–1882), Irish recipient of the Victoria Cross
 Tom Kavanagh (born 1970), Australian rules footballer
 Thomas Kavanagh (Irish criminal)

See also
 Tom Cavanagh (disambiguation)